Giovanni Cobolli Gigli (born 4 January 1945) is an Italian lawyer and former chairman of Juventus F.C. After obtaining a business degree from Bocconi University and starting out working in marketing for a multinational pharmaceutical company, he joined Turin company IFI S.p.A., which is now Exor, in 1973. He has been CEO of the Fabbri–Bompiani––Etas Publishing Group since 1984, then holding the same position in Arnoldo Mondadori Editore since 1993, and in the Rinascente Group since 1994. In 2006, he became chairman of the Exor-owned Juventus association football club.

Early life 
The son of Antongiulio Cobolli Gigli, he was born in Albese con Cassano, province of Como, in the Lombardy region, in 1945. He was the nephew of Giuseppe Cobolli Gigli, who was minister of public works for four years in the Mussolini government.

Business career 
In September 1980, Cobolli Gigli became the executive assistant to the CEO of the Fabbri Editorial Group. He became the general manager of that company in 1984; as RCS Group became stockholder of the Fabbri Editorial Group, in 1991, he was named CEO of Rizzoli's book sector in 1991. In November 1993, he joined the Mondadori publishing group and became CEO of parent company Arnoldo Mondadori Editore S.p.A., as well as the director of many other companies within the group. In November 1994, he left to become CEO and general manager of the Rinascente Group. He stayed there until July 2005.

He sat on the board of directors of the Italian Trade Agency and of Federdistribuzione, of which he was confirmed as chairman in 2011, 2014, 2018, and 2020.

Juventus F.C. 
In the wake of the controversial Calciopoli scandal, Cobolli Gigli became the chairman of the board of Juventus; being both the most supported and hated club in the country, one of the goals upon taking over Juventus was to be nice and more likeable. He completed the new triade along with Jean-Claude Blanc (managing director) and Alessio Secco (director of sport), which led Juventus back to the UEFA Champions League but they were not able to return the club to win Serie A or any other trophies, and left the position to Blanc in 2009. In 2010, Blanc was succeeded by Andrea Agnelli, who, along with Giuseppe Marotta as new director of sport, returned Juventus to dominance; in the aftermath of Calciopoli bis and the Calciopoli trials that acquitted the club, Agnelli also took a more radical and anti-system position compared to Cobolli Gigli, who was a moderate, and Gianni Agnelli's designed heir John Elkann, who is a reformist.

Cobolli Gigli's role in the aftermath of Calciopoli has been questioned and criticized. In September 2006, Cobolli Gigli took a U-turn from his previous statements, and led the moderate line to have the club controversially renounce the TAR's appeal; then CONI president Gianni Petrucci thanked Elkann and Montezemolo.

The lack of TAR appeal, which is one of the reasons for which the club's appeals to return the 2005 and 2006 scudetti and FIGC damage claims all failed, amounted to a sort of public plea bargain and guilty admission; however, the club was later acquitted in the first ordinary justice proceedings, and Juventus were not liable by other clubs, as the 2004–06 leagues were regular. The initial view was that Juventus were the main culprit, and referees, Inter Milan, and other clubs the victims. As early as 2010, when many other clubs were implicated and Inter Milan, Livorno, and Milan were liable of direct Article 6 violations (the one about illicits warranting relegation; Juventus were never charged of Article 6 violations) in the 2011 Palazzi Report but were time-barred by the statute of limitations and could not be put on trial, Juventus considered challenging the non-assignment of the 2005 title and the 2006 title assignment of third-placed Inter Milan, dependent on the results of Calciopoli trials connected to the scandal. In July 2011, the FIGC declared itself not competent to rule on the decision and the title remained to Inter Milan, as Juventus claimed €443 million in damage claims.

Cobolli Gigli came to agree on the criticism. In May 2018, he said that Inter Milan "deserved to be punished" for Calciopoli, and expressed regrets for the sporting trials, about which he said: "We were demoted to play the 2006–07 season in Serie B and accepted the ruling. The regret remains for a sporting trial that was, in my view, not conducted in the best way. Certain pieces of evidence were ignored, actually it's more accurate to say hidden, and the existence of other telephone wiretaps regarding different clubs wasn't made known at the time. Inter [Milan] too deserved to be punished for what emerged in the various conversations. The FIGC Prosecutor Palazzi said so. It all emerged when the matter missed the statute of limitations and it ended like that."

Cobolli Gigli remains a commentator for Juventus affairs. About the capital gains scandal of the 2020s, which led to Agnelli's resignation, about which Cobolli Gigli said was forced, he cited the Calciopoli unequal treatment and criticized the fact that only Juventus were punished. Videos emerged of Ciro Santoriello, the capital gains case's prosecutor, mocking Juve; he declared himself a tifoso of Napoli and an anti-Juventus prosecutor. In response, Cobolli Gigli said: "Benigni reminded us that Article 21, on freedom of thought, is the most important. However, the manifestation of one's ideas must always be limited to one's duties. Therefore, I believe that if these gentlemen want to express their thoughts, they must do so without playing the roles they currently do. Santoriello should have kept his feelings to himself as a judge, Juve's acquittal on that occasion counts for little."

See also 
 List of Juventus F.C. chairmen

Explanatory notes

References

External links 
 8ª Conferenza Nazionale del Franchising 2013 – Giovanni Cobolli Gigli at YouTube (in Italian)
 Giovanni Cobolli Gigli at Distribuzione Moderna (in Italian)
 Giovanni Cobolli Gigli at Eurosport (in Italian)
 Giovanni Cobolli Gigli at Juworld.net (in Italian)
 Giovanni Cobolli Gigli at MarketScreener (in Italian)
 Giovanni Cobolli Gigli at Radio Radicale (in Italian)
 Giovanni Cobolli Giglia at La Repubblica (in Italian)
 Marca 2012 – intervista a Giovanni Cobolli Gigli at YouTube (in Italian)
 World Finance Forum 2015: Intervista a Giovanni Cobolli Gigli at YouTube (in Italian)

1945 births
Bocconi University alumni
Italian football chairmen and investors
Juventus F.C. chairmen and investors
Juventus F.C. directors
Living people